Enter the Moonlight Gate is the second album by Lord Belial. It was released in 1997 by No Fashion Records. The eight and final track is continued on Lord Belial's next album named Unholy Crusade. In April 2014, Greek label Floga Records reissued Enter The Moonlight Gate for the first time on LP. This edition is limited to 250 copies black vinyl and 250 copies black/blue splatter vinyl both colors have slightly revised cover artwork and the new Lord Belial band logo.

Enter the Moonlight Gate is also available as an extremely limited (250 copies) digipak and comes with a poster.

Track listing 
 "Enter the Moonlight Gate" – 5:12 
 "Unholy Spell of Lilith" – 6:43 
 "Path with Endless Horizons" – 5:56 
 "Lamia" – 4:55 
 "Black Winter Bloodbath" – 4:57 
 "Forlorn in Silence" – 3:50 
 "Belial - Northern Prince of Evil" – 3:19 
 "Realm of a Thousand Burning Souls (Part 1)" – 20:04

Credits
 Micke Backelin - Drums
 Thomas Backelin - Vocals, electric & acoustic guitar
 Niclas Andersson - Guitars
 Anders Backelin - Bass

1997 albums
Lord Belial albums
Albums produced by Fredrik Nordström